The 1975 New York Cosmos season was the fifth season for the New York Cosmos in the now-defunct North American Soccer League. In the Cosmos' fifth year of existence the club finished 3rd in the five-team Northern Division and 12th out of 20 in the overall league table. Despite Pelé joining the club midseason in what English writer Gavin Newsham said was "the transfer coup of the century," bringing unprecedented attention to soccer in the United States, the Cosmos missed the playoffs for the second straight year.

Squad 

 

Source:

Results 
Source:

Friendlies

Preseason

Regular season 
Pld = Games Played, W = Wins, L = Losses, GF = Goals For, GA = Goals Against, Pts = Points
6 points for a win, 1 point for a shootout win, 0 points for a loss, 1 point for each goal scored (up to three per game).

Northern Division Standings

Overall League Placing 

Source:

Matches

See also
1975 North American Soccer League season
List of New York Cosmos seasons

References

External links
 Video of Pele's debut with the New York Cosmos

New York
New York Cosmos
New York Cosmos seasons
New York Cosmos